This list contains the universities and other institutions of tertiary education in Bogotá. The first university opened in Bogotá was Universidad Santo Tomás, on July 13, 1580, just 41 years after the Spanish foundation of the city. The Universidad Santo Tomás belongs to the religious Dominican order.

The second university of the city was opened on July 9, 1623 by the Jesuits with the name Universidad San Francisco Javier, which later on changed its name to Pontificia Universidad Javeriana. Its original facilities are part of the Museum of Colonial Art of Bogotá.

On December 31, 1651 the School of Our Lady of Rosary was founded by Fray Cristóbal de Torres. It still works today in its foundational site.

In 1867, the largest university of the country, the National University of Colombia is founded, consolidating Bogotá as the University Capital of Colombia.

On February 15, 1886 the Externado University of Colombia is founded by jurist and educator Nicolás Pinzón Warlosten.

On November 16, 1948; the first nonsectarian university in Colombia, the University of the Andes was founded by Mario Laserna Pinzón. Today, the University of the Andes is the best academy of Colombia and one of the best in Latin America and the world.

Bogotá's colleges and universities have had a major impact on the city and region's economy. Not only are they major employers, but they also attract national and international students. The large pool of professionals they graduate bring industries to the city and the surrounding region. Bogotá is Colombia's educational "Mecca"; it boasts more schools, colleges, and universities than any other city in Colombia.

List of universities 
There are more than one hundred tertiary education institutions in Bogotá alone. Following is a list of the most important ones:

 Centro Bolivariano de Educación Superior - Corbes
 Centro de Estudios COOTRADIAN
 Colegio de Estudios Superiores de Administración - CESA
 Colegio Mayor de Cundinamarca
 Colegio Odontológico Colombiano
 Colegio Superior de Telecomunicaciones
 Corporación Centro de Estudios Artísticos y Ténicos - CEART
 Corporación Centro de Nuestra Señora de las Mercedes
 Corporación Universitaria Cenda  - CENDA
 Corporación de Educación Superior - UNITEC
 Corporación Educativa AES
 Corporación Escuela de Artes y Letras
 Corporación Escuela de Diseños Industriales - ACADITEC
 Corporación Instituto Superior de Educación Social - ISES
 Corporación Instituto Tecnológico de la Seguridad - INTESEG
 Corporación Internacional para el Desarrollo Educativo - CIDE
 Corporación Instituto Colombo Alemán para la Formación Tecnológica - ICAFT
 Corporación Educativa Taller 5 Centro de Diseño
 Corporación John F. Kennedy
 Corporación para el Desarrollo Social Antonio Nariño - CORPDESAN
 Corporación Técnica de Colombia - CORPOTEC
 Corporación Tecnológica Industrial Colombiana
 Corporación Tecnológica de Bogotá
 Corporación Unificada Nacional de Educación Superior - CUN
 Corporación Universal de Investigación y Tecnología - CORUNIVERSITEC
 Corporación Universitaria de Ciencia y Desarrollo
 Corporación Universitaria de Ciencias Aplicadas y Ambientales - UDCA
 Corporación Universitaria de Colombia Ideas
 Corporación Universitaria Iberoamericana
 Corporación Universitaria Minuto de Dios - UNIMINUTO
 Corporación Universitaria Nueva Colombia
 Corporación Universitaria Republicana
 Escuela Colombiana de Carreras Industriales - ECCI
 Escuela Colombiana de Diseño
 Escuela Colombiana de Hotelería y Turismo - ECOTET
 Escuela Colombiana de Ingeniería Julio Garavito - ECI
 Escuela Colombiana de Rehabilitación
 Escuela de Administración de Negocios - EAN
 Escuela de Arte y Diseño de Arquitectura e Ingeniería
 Escuela Internacional de Diseño y Comercio La Salle
 Escuela Superior de Administración Pública - ESAP
 Escuela Superior de Oftalmología, Instituto Barraquer de América
 Fundación Centro de Educación Superior, Investigación y Profesionalización - CEDINPRO
 Fundación Centro de Investigación, Docencia y Consultoría Administrativa - CIDCA
 Fundación Centro de Investigación y Estudios Odontológicos - CIEO
 Fundación de Educación Superior - ESATEC
 Fundación de Educación Superior Nueva América
 Fundación de Educación Superior San José - FESSANJOSE
 Fundación Escuela Superior Profesional - INPAHU
 Fundación Eurocolombiana de Educación Superior
 Fundación Instituto Superior de Carreras Técnicas - INSUTEC
 Fundación Interamericana Técnica - FIT
 Fundación para la Educación Superior Real de Colombia
 Fundación para la Educación Superior San Mateo
 Fundación Tecnológica Autónoma de Bogotá - FABA
 Fundación Tecnológica de Madrid, Cundinamarca
 Fundación Tecnológica San Francisco de Asís
 Fundación Universidad Central de Colombia
 Fundación Universitaria Agraria de Colombia
 Fundación Universitaria Ciencias de la Salud
 Fundación Universitaria del Area Andina
 Fundación Universitaria Empresarial de la Camara de Comercio de Bogotá
 Fundación Universitaria Iberoamericana - FUNIBER
 Fundacion Universitaria Juan N. Corpas
 Fundación Universitaria Konrad Lorenz
 Fundación Universitaria Los Libertadores
 Fundación Universitaria Manuela Beltrán
 Fundación Universitaria Monserrate
 Fundación Universitaria Panamericana
 Fundación Universitaria Sanitas
 Fundación Universitaria San Alfonso
 Fundación Universitaria San Martín
 Improvisatec
 Instituto de Ciencias de la Salud - CES
 Instituto Nacional de Telecomunicaciones - INSTEL
 Instituto Técnico Central La Salle
 Institución Tecnológica de Educación Superior - ICSEF
 Institucion Universitaria Colombo Americana - UNICA
 Institucion Universitaria Unión Latina - UNILATINA
 Jorge Tadeo Lozano University
 Politécnico Colombo Andino
 Institución Universitaria Politécnico Grancolombiano
 Politécnico Internacional
 Pontificia Universidad Javeriana
 Servicio Nacional de Aprendizaje - SENA
 Universidad de Bogotá Jorge Tadeo Lozano
 Universidad de San Buenaventura
 Universidad Distrital Francisco José de Caldas
 Universidad Antonio Nariño
 Universidad Autónoma de Colombia
 Universidad Católica de Colombia
 Universidad Central
 Universidad Cooperativa de Colombia
 Universidad de América
 Universidad de Cundinamarca
 Universidad de La Sabana
 Universidad de La Salle 
 Universidad de Los Andes
 Universidad del Bosque
 Universidad Sergio Arboleda
 Universidad del Rosario
 Universidad Externado de Colombia
 Universidad Incca de Colombia
 Universidad La Gran Colombia
 Universidad Libre
 Universidad Manuela Beltrán
 Universidad Militar Nueva Granada
 Universidad Nacional Abierta y a Distancia - UNAD
 Universidad Nacional de Colombia
 Universidad Pedagógica Nacional
 Universidad Pedagógica y Tecnológica de Colombia
 Universidad Piloto de Colombia
 Universidad Santo Tomás de Aquino

See also 
 List of universities in Colombia

External links 
 Spanish Schools of Bogotá
 List of Universities in Bogotá